Bedsitcom is a British reality television hoax series that was broadcast on Channel 4 in December 2003. Pitched as "somewhere between a sitcom and a reality TV show", the show documented the lives of six young people living in a loft flat in London. Its hook was that its TV audience was aware that three of the participants—named Mel, Paul and Rufus—were actually actors being directed by a trio of "writers" in a garage on the ground floor.

Bedsitcom was commissioned by the Channel Four Television Corporation and produced by Objective Productions. Producers auditioned thousands of people to be the show's genuine subjects and selected from them six young adults to live in the flat with the three actors. These six participants were told that they would be starring in a new reality TV series called Making Friends, and featured on the show three at a time over a period of eight weeks. The programme ran for a single series of eight episodes and featured various storylines, involving dead goldfish, dodgy dealings, promiscuous mothers and telephone psychics.

The show received largely negative feedback from television reviewers, who criticised the show's premise as a "deeply offensive" idea. It received a viewership peak of 1.2 million with its final episode, giving it an audience share of 8.9 per cent. Bedsitcom was not recommissioned for a second series and is currently not available either on DVD or on Channel 4's on demand service, 4oD.

Production

Concept
Bedsitcom was created by Peter James and Andrew O'Connor, and was conceived as a parody of both reality television and the traditional sitcom. It combined these two elements by featuring three members of the public being unknowingly placed in extraordinary situations by three actors being directed by writers. After being commissioned for Channel 4 by Danielle Lux, Bedsitcom was produced by Matt Crook and Kirsty Smith of Objective Productions.

The show was pitched as "somewhere between a sitcom and a reality TV show" and was promoted as "an entirely new genre of television programme". Its title is a portmanteau of the words "bedsit"—a British term referring to a form of rented accommodation consisting of a single room and shared bathroom—and "sitcom". The title is technically a misnomer: as the accommodation's bedroom and sitting area were separate, it was not a bedsit.

Casting

Melanie Ash, Paul Gibbon and Rufus Jones were selected as the three actors to feature in Bedsitcom. Jones had previously portrayed the part of Crispin in the 2002 drama White Teeth; Gibbon had played the lead role of Link in the series Stone Cold. To avoid breaking character, all three used their real names while living in the flat and went through weeks of rehearsals. O'Connor described the entire process as "exhausting".

To find suitable candidates to live with the three actors, producers auditioned roughly 10,000 people, who were told that they would be taking part in a new reality television programme in London called Making Friends. Six members of the public, named Barrington, Bob, Dave, David, Jessica and Shirine, were selected to feature on the show.

Writing and filming
The plots for Bedsitcom were devised by a team of writers (led by Rob Gibbons, Neil Gibbons and producer Matt Crook) located in a garage on the ground floor of the apartment building that the contestants were staying in. The writers would often appear on screen and explain to the TV audience what their intention for each episode was. They communicated with Ash, Gibbon and Jones either by ringing them on their mobile phones, or by calling them downstairs to speak to them in person. They would occasionally change their plans for an episode—in "Worst Case Scenario", for example, the writers altered their storyline from having Mel bring various animals into the flat to having the group kill Mel's goldfish after only one night.

Among the team of writers were Jesse Armstrong and Sam Bain, who had created the Channel 4 sitcom Peep Show with O'Connor earlier that year, plus Rob Gibbons and Neil Gibbons. Filming of Bedsitcom began in May 2003 and lasted for approximately eight weeks. The flatmates were filmed for 12 hours a day, with this footage then being edited down to roughly 25 minutes per week of filming.

Episodes
Bedsitcom documented the lives of six young adults living in a loft flat in London. Eight episodes in total were created, which were divided into two distinct halves. The first four episodes centred on the lives of Mel, Paul and Rufus, the three actors, as they lived in the flat with Bob, Dave and Shirine, the three unaware members of the public who believed they were taking part in a genuine reality TV show. After Bob, Dave and Shirine had learnt the true nature of the show at the end of episode four, they moved out and were replaced by three new members of the public named Barrington, David and Jessica. These three new cast members remained on Bedsitcom for the final four episodes.

Reception

Critical reception
Reviewers gave Bedsitcom generally negative feedback. Some were critical of the storylines that had been devised by the writers, calling them unimaginative and clichéd. Others were critical of the premise of the show itself, describing it as "deeply offensive and manipulative"—all three actors, particularly Jones, received criticism for their acting abilities. Frances Traynor of The Daily Record called the show "about as funny as sharing a flat with that German cannibal" and Paddy Sherman of The Liverpool Echo branded the show "intensely irritating". Paul Hoggart of The Times called it "a show that seemed to have nothing to recommend it whatsoever",—after watching the first episode, Charlie Catchpole of The Daily Star simply stated: "It isn't funny." Critics on Newsnight Review also spoke harshly about the programme, with Tom Paulin calling it "a disgraceful piece of television" and Jeanette Winterson describing it as "incredibly dull".

A slightly more positive review came from Joe Joseph of The Times, who suggested that "if [the format] works, [it] could be profitably franchised around the world". Deborah Bull said that, while it was "a terrible programme", there were "some funny lines". Chris Wilson, editor of Collective, similarly wrote that "while the end results are often amusing and tackle some interesting storylines, the whole project smacks of lazy, cruel television".

In a 2005 interview, series creator Andrew O'Connor spoke about Bedsitcom and the critical reaction that it had received. He said that he felt that the premise of the show was a "great idea", but that it did not make "great television". He also remarked: "We didn't cast it right and the public didn't take to the series."

Ratings and awards
Given the level of exposure and promotion that it had been granted, Channel Four were disappointed by ratings for Bedsitcom. The pilot, shown on 8 December 2003, generated 1 million viewers, but this figure had fallen to 700,000 by 10 December. The ratings rose to 1.1 million viewers for the fourth episode, "Fag Ends". On average, the series attracted an audience share of less than 6 per cent. The final episode, "P.I.G", gained a viewership of 1.2 million with a market share of 8.9 per cent, which was its highest audience for the series. Bedsitcom was nominated for a single award at the 2004 Rose d'Or festival, a European awards show that commemorates achievement in entertainment television. The programme was submitted in the Best Situation Comedy category, but was beaten by Peep Show.

Distribution
Bedsitcom was distributed by the Channel Four Television Corporation, who broadcast the show on its eponymous channel. It premiered in the UK at 10:40 p.m. on 8 December 2003. Bedsitcom's eight episodes were 'stripped' over two weeks: the first four were broadcast nightly until 11 December and the remaining four were shown each night from 15 December. There are currently no plans to revive the series, and it is not available either on DVD or on 4oD, Channel 4's on demand service.

See also
2003 in British television
The Dutch Elm Conservatoire – a British sketch comedy group featuring Jones
The Joe Schmo Show – a similar American series

References
Primary sources

Secondary sources

Bibliography

External links

2000s British comedy television series
2003 British television series debuts
2003 British television series endings
British reality television series
Channel 4 sitcoms
English-language television shows
Reality television series parodies
Television series by All3Media
Television shows set in London